The Pskov Land was a historical region in the north-west of the medieval Russia centred around the city of Pskov. It was a vassal state of various Rus' states and had a measure of independence as Pskov Republic before being annexed by the Grand Duchy of Moscow. It had an important role in the trade and conflicts between Russia and its western neighbours.

Geography
Pskov is situated on the southern shore of the Lake Peipus, to the east of Livonia, and to the west of Novgorod. In the 13th century, the Principality of Pskov was a narrow strip of land along the eastern Narva River and Peipus, bordered to the south by the Velikaya River basin. The division between Livonia and Pskov was made up by an area of water bodies and poorly settled areas.

History

Early history
The town of Pskov was founded in the late 9th century by the Rus'. Olga of Kiev, the wife of Igor of Kiev, was born in Pskov. In 1065–67, Vseslav attacked Pskov and Novgorod, then was captured by Iziaslav I of Kiev and his two brothers and imprisoned in Kiev.

13th century
 
In 1218, the princes of Novgorod and Pskov attacked Estonia and Latvia, while the Lithuanians had attacked Pskov in the meantime. A conflict ensued in the following years between Pskov and Letgallia. Pskov invaded Livonia in 1221.

The Novgorod Chronicle mentions the campaign Yaroslav Vsevolodovich of Novgorod in 1228; Yaroslav led his army against Pskov, upon which the inhabitants sealed the city and refused to let Yaroslav in. There were rumours that Yaroslav now wanted to imprison Pskov's most notable men, but Yaroslav declared that he had good intentions, wanting to deliver gifts, and now assembled an army and to attack Riga. Now, Pskov entered a military alliance with Riga. The Novgorod nobility believed that Yaroslav had merely used the pretext of attacking Riga to conquer Pskov. Yaroslav now asked Pskov to take part in the attack, but Pskov refused.

Between 1236 and 1242, the Kievan Rus', except Novgorod, Pskov, Smolensk and Polotsk, was conquered by the Golden Horde. The Grand Duchy of Lithuania quickly expanded their influence on the western Rus' lands in the second half of the 13th century, these Russian principalities preserving a kind of autonomy, still under the direct rule of the various branches of the Rurikids.

The Teutonic knights captured a fort southwest of Pskov, then occupied the city in 1240 and established rule to the west of Novgorod. After appeals from Novgorod, Grand Prince Yaroslav sent two brothers, Alexander and Andrey, who expelled the knights and halted their eastern advance.

14th century
In 1316, Pskov troops took part in a Novgorod campaign against Tver.

In the 1320s, the coalitions of the Teutonic knights and Novgorod, on one side, and of Lithuania, Pskov and their Livonian allies, on the other side, faced each other in the region. In 1322–23 Pskov campaigned as a Lithuanian dependency, probably first in the Lithuanian attack on Dorpat (March 1322), then in the Grodno raid into Danish Estonia (1323). In response, in May 1323, knight Kesselhuth launched an 18-day siege of Pskov, while Pskov's request to Novgorod and Yuri Danilovich for aid were refused. The siege was ended after an army dispatch from Lithuania, after which peace was agreed.

Alexander of Tver was forced to flee after a joint Muscovite–Tatar invasion in 1327, and found refuge in Pskov. He was excommunicated by the city metropolitan, but returned in 1331, ruling the city until 1337.

Pskov Republic

Part of Russia

Rulers

References

Sources

Subdivisions of Kievan Rus'
Former principalities
History of Pskov
Historical regions in Russia